Lassen Community College is a public community college in Susanville, California. It is a part of the California Community Colleges System.

The college is located in Susanville in the high mountain lake country of northeastern California. The campus looks out over the city to Diamond Peak and the Sierra Nevada.

Lassen Community College offers A.S. and A.A. degrees as well as CTE, online, and distance programs. Carie Camacho is the interim Superintendent and President, serving in those roles since 2022.

==

Gunsmithing

The Lassen Community College Gunsmithing Program was established in 1945 and is the oldest gunsmithing school in the United States. The program offers Associate in Science Degrees in Firearms Repair and General Gunsmithing, as well as Certificates of Completion for Pistolsmith, Riflesmith, Long Guns, and Gunsmith Machinist and Metal Finishing.

Fire Science
Lassen Community College’s fire science program runs academies for Cal Fire. Prior to the ordered closure of the California Correctional Center it was the main training hub for incarcerated firefighters in Northern California.

Athletics

Lassen Community College competes in the CCCAA division for all athletics programs except for rodeo (NIRA). Programs for men include baseball, basketball, wrestling, soccer, and rodeo. Programs for women include softball, basketball, wrestling, soccer, rodeo, volleyball, and beach volleyball. 

The first school mascot was the Camel, from 1937 to shortly after World War II.  The current school mascot is the Cougar. All Cougars athletics programs participate in the Golden Valley Conference and compete against other community colleges, such as Butte College, Feather River College, Lake Tahoe Community College, College of the Redwoods, Shasta College and College of the Siskiyous.

Notable alumni
 Kelly Anundson, wrestler; professional MMA fighter
 Brock Lesnar, Current professional WWE wrestler, WWE Universal Heavyweight Champion and former UFC Heavyweight Champion
 Shelton Benjamin, Current professional WWE wrestler, Benjamin has held multiple championships, including the WWE Intercontinental Championship and WWE United States Championship.
 Quinton Jackson (attended), professional Mixed Martial Artist, former UFC Light-Heavyweight Champion
 Anthony Johnson, Junior College National Wrestling Champion; retired mixed martial artist in the Light Heavyweight Division of the UFC
 Vladimir Matyushenko (attended), two-time National Junior College champion ('96, '97); retired mixed martial artist, formerly for the Ultimate Fighting Championship
 Jaelin Williams, soccer player of the Bahamas national football team
 Robert Stone (basketball), basketball; professional National Basketball League (Australia), Melbourne Tigers

Notable educators
 Robert Todd Carroll (born 1945), publisher of The Skeptic's Dictionary and fellow for Committee for Skeptical Inquiry
 Jean LaMarr, artist

References

External links
 

California Community Colleges
Schools accredited by the Western Association of Schools and Colleges
Education in Lassen County, California